Clapping Music is a minimalist piece written by Steve Reich in 1972. It is written for two performers and is performed entirely by clapping.

Reich and his ensemble were on tour in Europe in 1972. After a concert in Brussels, the promoter asked him if they would like to go see some flamenco music. They ended in a club and watched a pair of musicians who by Reich's account were terrible guitarists and singers. However, when they started clapping very loudly,  Reich and his group, who were mainly percussionists, joined in. After the concert Reich realised that he could use this as the basis for work, not least as it could be performed with only a few people rather than taking two trucks of equipment.

A development of the phasing technique from Reich's earlier works such as Piano Phase, it was written when Reich wanted to (in his own words) "create a piece of music that needed no instruments beyond the human body". However, he quickly found that the mechanism of phasing slowly in and out of tempo with each other was inappropriate for the simple clapping involved in producing the actual sounds that made the music.

Instead of phasing, one performer claps a basic rhythm, a variation of the fundamental African bell pattern in 12/8 time, for the entirety of the piece. The other claps the same pattern, but after every 8 or 12 bars shifts by one eighth note to the right, skipping one note or rest in the pattern.
The two performers continue this until the second performer has shifted 12 eighth notes and is hence playing the pattern in unison with the first performer again (as at the beginning), some 144 bars later. The variation of the African bell pattern is minimal; it contains just one additional beat. However, this minimal addition results in a much more interesting piece from the point of view of the variation of syncopation as the piece progresses. A typical recording of the piece, as included in Reich's Works 1965–1995 box set, lasts just under five minutes.

The piece was performed at the Contemporary Arts Museum in Houston, Texas, on 13 November 1973.

In dance, the piece was used in 1982 by the Belgian choreographer Anne Teresa De Keersmaeker as part of one of her seminal works, Fase, which became a cornerstone of contemporary dance.

In 2012 an authorized arrangement for solo piano of Clapping Music was released on the album Which Way Is Up? by Simon Rackham, with permission granted by the publisher Universal Edition (London).

Imagine Dragons used Clapping Music as the foundation for their 2012 hit "On Top of the World" on their debut studio album Night Visions, although only a sample is used and Reich's composition does not progress over the course of the song. The piece is also utilized on a remix by James Murphy of the David Bowie song "Love Is Lost".

There is a Clapping Music app available for iOS.

References

External links 
Reich, Steve. "Steve Reich Clapping Music Video Medium". stevereich.com

Compositions by Steve Reich
1972 compositions
Process music pieces
Percussion music